TV 2 Play is a TV 2 On demand Channel. This channel rebroadcasts programs from TV 2, TV 2 Zulu, TV 2 Charlie, TV 2 Fri, TV 2 Sport, TV 2 News and TV 2 Sport X.

This is a pay channel, and is only broadcast on the Internet.

External links 
Official Site

Television stations in Denmark
Television channels and stations established in 2004